Mohammed Diallo (born 22 May 1983) is an Ivorian former professional footballer who played as an attacking midfielder.

Career
Born in Marcory, Ivory Coast, Diallo started his European career at Beveren, where he played with Ivorians, such as Emmanuel Eboué, Boubacar Barry and Yaya Touré.

In the summer of 2006, like many youth products, Diallo was sold to FC Sion, signing a three-year contract. He was loaned to Maccabi Petah Tikva and FC Chiasso. In July 2008, he left Sion and signed a contract with FC Champagne Sports and signed just one year later with Ajax Cape Town on 7 August 2009.

References

External links
 

1983 births
Living people
Ivorian footballers
Association football midfielders
Belgian Pro League players
Swiss Super League players
Ligue 2 players
Championnat National players
Championnat National 2 players
South African Premier Division players
K.S.K. Beveren players
FC Sion players
Maccabi Petah Tikva F.C. players
FC Chiasso players
Cape Town Spurs F.C. players
ÉFC Fréjus Saint-Raphaël players
FC Nantes players
Gazélec Ajaccio players
US Roye-Noyon players
Ivorian expatriate footballers
Ivorian expatriate sportspeople in Belgium
Expatriate footballers in Belgium
Ivorian expatriate sportspeople in Switzerland
Expatriate footballers in Switzerland
Ivorian expatriate sportspeople in Israel
Expatriate footballers in Israel
Ivorian expatriate sportspeople in France
Expatriate footballers in France
Ivorian expatriate sportspeople in South Africa
Expatriate soccer players in South Africa